= El Eco Obrero (Sucre, 1916) =

- Type: Fortnightly
- Founded: 1916
- Ceased publication: 1917
- Language: Spanish language
- Headquarters: Sucre

El Eco Obrero ('The Workers Echo') was a fortnightly workers newspaper published from Sucre, Bolivia 1916–1917. It carried the by-line "Organ of the working class".

The newspaper was founded by two workers, Miguel Navarro and Miguel Santos Sea. The newspaper was printed at Imprenta de la Industria. El Eco Obrero advocated unity in action between capitalists and workers.
